Badenhausen is a village and a former municipality in the district of Göttingen, in Lower Saxony, Germany. Since 1 March 2013, it is part of the municipality Bad Grund.

References

Former municipalities in Lower Saxony